The Official Fiction was the fourth studio album by Australian band Something for Kate. The album debuted at Number 1 on the ARIA charts and earned platinum status for sales exceeding 70,000 units. It earned the band four ARIA Music Award nominations (Album of the Year, Best Rock Album, Best Group, Best Cover Art) and took out Rolling Stone's Album of the Year and Single of the Year for "Déjà Vu". The first single from the album, "Déjà Vu", remains a staple of their live sets.  It was followed by two other singles, "Song for a Sleepwalker" and "Moving Right Along".

Track listing
(All songs by Something for Kate except where noted)
"Max Planck" – 4:41
"Best Weapon" – 4:47
"Song for a Sleepwalker" – 3:54
"Kaplan/Thornhill" – 4:44
"Light at the End of the Tunnel" – 3:36
"Letter to the Editor" – 3:31
"Déjà Vu" – 4:26
"Reverse Soundtrack" – 4:41
"Coldwater Canyon" – 4:23
"Souvenir" – 3:24
"Moving Right Along" – 3:27
"Asleep at the Wheel" – 3:56
"No Man's Land" – 4:17

Deluxe edition bonus disc 
The 2014 deluxe edition included a bonus disc of the album's B-sides.

Track listing
"Losing My Mind" – 4:55
"Blueprint Architecture" – 3:30
"You Only Hide (Live Acoustic version)" – 4:16
"Moving Right Along – Alternate version" – 3:22
"Anchorman II" – 4:50
"Faster" – 5:41
"Life of the Party" – 5:40
"Ashes to Ashes" (Live at the POW) (David Bowie) – 4:36
"Hanging on the Telephone" (Jack Lee) – 2:38

Personnel

Something for Kate
 Paul Dempsey – guitars, vocals
 Stephanie Ashworth – bass
 Clint Hyndman – drums

Additional personnel
 Grant-Lee Phillips – backing vocals ("No Man's Land")
 Caitlin Cary – backing vocals ("Song for a Sleepwalker")
 Lisa Germano – backing vocals ("Light at the End of the Tunnel", "Reverse Soundtrack")
 Kathryn Brownhill – violin ("Song for a Sleepwalker", "Reverse Soundtrack", "Coldwater Canyon", "Souvenir")
 Catherine Tabrett – cello ("Light at the End of the Tunnel", "Reverse Soundtrack", "Coldwater Canyon")
 The Section Quartet ("Kaplan/Thornhill", "Deja Vu"):
 Eric Gorfain – violin
 Daphne Chan – violin
 Richard Dodd – cello
 Leah Katz – viola

Charts

Certifications

Release history

References

2003 albums
Something for Kate albums
Murmur (record label) albums
Albums produced by Trina Shoemaker